The Santa Maria River, is a river in the province of Bulacan, Philippines. Its major tributaries are the Caypombo River and an unnamed river in San Jose del Monte.

Rivers of the Philippines
Landforms of Bulacan